St. Andrew's Evangelical Lutheran Church Complex, also known as Deliverance Temple of God & Christ, is a historic Evangelical Lutheran church complex located at Buffalo in Erie County, New York.  The complex consists of the original German Lutheran church structure constructed in 1859 and later remodeled into a school; the eclectic Gothic-Romanesque style church structure constructed in 1885; and the Queen Anne style parish house constructed in 1892.

It was listed on the National Register of Historic Places in 1983.

References

Churches on the National Register of Historic Places in New York (state)
Queen Anne architecture in New York (state)
Gothic Revival church buildings in New York (state)
Churches completed in 1859
19th-century Lutheran churches in the United States
Lutheran churches in New York (state)
Churches in Buffalo, New York
German-American culture in Buffalo, New York
National Register of Historic Places in Buffalo, New York